KeeWeb is a free and open-source password manager compatible with KeePass, available as a web version and desktop apps. The underlying file format is KDBX (KeePass database file).

Technology 
KeeWeb is written in JavaScript and uses WebCrypto and WebAssembly to process password files in the browser, without uploading them to a server. It can synchronize files with popular file hosting services, such as Dropbox, Google Drive, and OneDrive.

KeeWeb is also available as an Electron bundle which resembles a desktop app. The desktop version adds some features not available on web:

 auto-typing passwords
 ability to open and save local files
 sync to WebDAV without CORS enabled

KeeWeb can also be deployed as a standalone server, or installed as a Nextcloud app.

Reception 
KeeWeb was praised by Ghacks Technology News in 2016 as "brand-new" fixing the "shortcoming of a web-based version" of KeePass, and by Tech Advisor in 2020 as "well-designed cross-platform password manager".

See also 

 List of password managers
 Password manager
 Cryptography

References

External links 
 
 

Cryptographic software
Free password managers
Password managers
Android (operating system) software
IOS software
Linux software
MacOS software
Windows software